Frank Hunter and Helen Wills were the defending champions, but did not participate.

Jack Crawford and Elizabeth Ryan defeated Daniel Prenn and Hilde Krahwinkel in the final, 6–1, 6–3 to win the mixed doubles tennis title at the 1930 Wimbledon Championships.

Seeds

  Bill Tilden /  Cilly Aussem (quarterfinals)
  Jack Crawford /  Elizabeth Ryan (champions)
  Henri Cochet /  Eileen Fearnley-Whittingstall (semifinals)
  Jean Borotra /  Lilí de Álvarez (withdrew)

Draw

Finals

Top half

Section 1

Section 2

Section 3

Section 4

Bottom half

Section 5

Section 6

Section 7

Section 8

References

External links

X=Mixed Doubles
Wimbledon Championship by year – Mixed doubles